FHO may refer to:

 Femoral head ostectomy
 Foreign Armies East, a Nazi German military intelligence organization
 Foundation house officer
 University of Applied Sciences of Eastern Switzerland